is a Japanese professional footballer who plays as a midfielder for the Serie A club Inter Milan. 

Born in Takarazuka, Hyōgo Prefecture, Mihashi begun her professional career with MyNavi Sendai in Japan's Nadeshiko League in 2017 after graduating from university. She joined Serie A side Sassuolo in 2020. In the summer of 2022, she joined Inter Milan.

Club career

MyNavi Sendai 
Following the end of Mihashi's college career with the Osaka Sports University women's football team, in 2017 she joined MyNavi Sendai Vegalta in the Nadeshiko League, the top level of the Japanese league pyramid at the time. She spent three seasons at the Sendai club where she made 23 Nadeshiko League appearances, 20 WE League Cup appearances, scoring 2 goals, and 7 Empress Cup appearances, scoring 1 goal, deciding at the end of the 2019 season to leave the club in search of a new challenge.

Sassuolo 
In the summer of 2020, it was announced that Mihashi would be playing for U.S. Sassuolo Calcio in the upcoming season. Head coach Gianpiero Piovani decided to give Mihashi her Serie A debut in the first game of the season. Her first season saw Sassuolo finishing in third place, with most of the season spent fighting A.C. Milan for second position, and being rewarded with a place in the UEFA Women's Champions League. Piovani employed her in all 22 Serie A matches, where Mihashi scored for the first time in game week 6, in a 3–0 home win over Fiorentina.

Remaining with Sassuolo for the 2021–2022 season, she made 20 league appearances, as well as scoring the winning goal in the final match of the season in a 2–1 win over Inter Milan. In her second season she helped Sassuolo finish in fourth place, narrowly missing the final Champions League spot.

Inter Milan 
During the summer of 2022, Inter Milan announced Mihashi would be joining them for the upcoming 2022–2023 season. She made her debut for the club in a 3–3 draw against Juventus on 11 September 2022

International career
Mihashi was part of the Japan national under-23 football team between 2014 and 2017. During her time with the team, she took part in the Gwangju Universiade, scoring a goal against Mexico, and obtaining the bronze medal.

Career statistics

Club

References

External links 

Japanese women's footballers
Mynavi Vegalta Sendai Ladies players
Inter Milan (women) players
1994 births
Living people
Women's association football midfielders